Byatarayana Betta is a small hill in Dodduru Karapanahalli near Aaladamara of Kolar Gold Fields in Kolar district.

It has a temple dedicated to lord Vishnu who is worshipped as Bytrayappa. The story goes that Lord Venkateshwara from Tirupati had come hunting here. Betae in Kannada language means "hunting".

This hill has in it some caves which are believed to have been used by human ancestors.

Hills of Karnataka
Geography of Kolar district